62nd ACE Eddie Awards
February 18, 2012

Feature Film (Dramatic): 
The Descendants

Feature Film (Comedy or Musical): 
The Artist

The 62nd American Cinema Editors Eddie Awards, which were presented on February 18, 2012 at the Beverly Hilton Hotel, honored the best editors in films and television.

Nominees were announced on January 11, 2012.

Winners

Film

Television

Student Competition:Eric Kench - Video Symphony'''

References

External links
ACE Award 2012 at the Internet Movie Database

62
2011 film awards
2011 guild awards
2012 in American cinema